A placemat or table mat is a covering or pad designating an individual place setting, unlike the larger tablecloth that covers the entire surface. Placemats are made from many different materials, depending on their purpose: to protect, decorate, entertain or advertise. Materials and production methods range from mass-produced and commercial, to local and traditional.

Uses 
Their primary function is to protect the dinner table from water marks, food stains or heat damage. They also serve as decoration, especially placemats made from lace or silk. In restaurants, they can be used to advertise menu items, specials, local businesses or games for children. If the mat is cotton, it can absorb water and other liquids, such as spilt drinks. 

Higher-end placemats – made from vinyl or leather – are used by hotels and organizations for meetings as they provide a writing surface, and give an area on which to lean comfortably and to place objects on the table with minimal noise during meetings.

Contemporary opinion on the usefulness of placemats is mixed. Cloth placemats are commonly considered to be unnecessary and require excessive upkeep - compared to the surface of a table (which can be easily cleaned), a stained placemat must be run through the washer and drier before it can be used again. Moreover, plastic placemats have drawn criticism on environmental grounds.

See also 

 Tablecloth
 Doily
 Beverage coaster
 Marghab Linens - a mid-20th-century company historically renowned for fine-quality table linen.
 Neatnik Saucer
 The Dinner Party – an artwork depicting unique dinner place settings for a group of notable women from history

References 

Serving and dining
Linens
Domestic implements